Kramfors Municipality (Kramfors kommun) is a municipality in Västernorrland County, northern Sweden. Its seat is located in the town Kramfors.

The rural municipality of Gudmundrå was in 1947 made one of the last administrative cities of Sweden and got the name Kramfors from an industrial settlement. In 1952 many of the surrounding entities were grouped into larger municipalities. The nationwide reform in 1971 made Kramfors a unitary municipality, but the amalgamation process was not fulfilled until 1974. The number of original units within the present municipality is eleven, including Bjärtrå.

The municipality features the Sandö Bridge, crossing the Ångerman River. It is a concrete bridge in one span, and with a length of 264 meters it was the longest of that kind from its inauguration 1943 to 1964.

Nearby is a monument to the people killed in the Ådalen shootings, 1931, when the Swedish military shot socialist demonstrators, killing five.

The UNESCO World Heritage Area Höga kusten ("High coast" in English) is located on the east coast of Kramfors municipality.

References

External links

Kramfors - Official site

Municipalities of Västernorrland County